Anete Lāce (born 13 July 2003) is a Latvian figure skater. She is the 2020 Volvo Open Cup silver medalist, a three-time Latvian junior national champion (2018–20), and competed in the final segment at the 2020 World Junior Championships.

Personal life 
Lāce was born on 13 July 2003 in Riga. She is the daughter of 1992 Olympian Alma Lepina, the first figure skater to represent Latvia at the Olympics.

Programs

Competitive highlights 
CS: Challenger Series; JGP: Junior Grand Prix

References

External links 
 

2003 births
Latvian female single skaters
Living people
Sportspeople from Riga
21st-century Latvian women